Marion Harding High School is a public high school in Marion, Ohio. Opened in 1893 under the name Marion High School, it received its current name in 1920. It is the only high school in the Marion City School District.  The school mascot is the Presidents (often shortened to Prexies) and is symbolized by an eagle named Warren G.  They are currently a member of the Mid Ohio Athletic Conference (MOAC). Enrollment was 969 as of October 2017.

The school was named after Marion's most famous son, Warren G. Harding. The original school site is a mere 1/2 mile from the Harding Memorial, which is one of the largest presidential memorials located outside of the Washington D.C. area. In 2003, a new high school was erected with assistance of state funds offered for the replacement and/or upgrade of older school facilities. The old building now houses Grant Middle School.

Ohio High School Athletic Association State Championships

Boys Track and Field – 1983
Boys Cross Country – 1952
Boys Football - 1958 (UPI poll)

Notable alumni
John Courtright, Former MLB player (Cincinnati Reds)
Norman Thomas (1884-1968), Presbyterian minister, co-founder of The National Civil Liberties Bureau, which eventually became the American Civil Liberties Union. He was also a six-time Socialist Party of America candidate for president.
James A. Beckel, Jr. (born 1948), Composer and principle trombonist with the Indianapolis Symphony Orchestra. 
Bill Sims (1949-2019), Grammy-nominated, American Blues musician. He was featured in an episode of the PBS documentary series American Love Story about the racism he faced as a teenager while dating his future wife, who was white.

External links
District Website

Notes and references

High schools in Marion County, Ohio
Public high schools in Ohio
Buildings and structures in Marion, Ohio
1920 establishments in Ohio